Joseph C. Brun (April 21, 1907 – November 13, 1998) was a French-American cinematographer who did movies as well as a couple early TV shows.

He was nominated for Best Cinematography-Black and White at the 26th Academy Awards for the film Martin Luther.'

Filmography
Touch Me Not (1974)
The 300 Year Weekend (1971)
Explosion (1969)
Slaves (1969)
Trilogy (1969)
The Fat Spy (1966)
Who Killed Teddy Bear (1965) (as Joseph Brun) 
Flipper (1963) (as Joseph Brun) 
Hatari! (1962) (associate photographer) (as Joseph Brun) 
Girl of the Night (1960)
Thunder in Carolina (1960)
The Last Mile (1959)
Middle of the Night (1959)
Odds Against Tomorrow (1959)
Wind Across the Everglades (1958) (as Joseph Brun)
Windjammer (1958)
Edge of the City (1957) (as Joseph Brun)
Naughty Girl (1957) (as Joseph Brun)
Cinerama Holiday (1955)
Love at Night (1955) 
Nights of Montmartre (1955)
Special Delivery (1955)
The Joe Louis Story (1953) (as Joseph Brun)
Martin Luther (1953)
Walk East on Beacon! (1952) (as Joseph Brun)
The Whistle at Eaton Falls (1951) (as Joseph Brun)

References

External links

1907 births
1998 deaths
American cinematographers
Cinematographers from Paris
French emigrants to the United States